Shalom "Sam" Jaffe (March 10, 1891 – March 24, 1984) was an American actor, teacher, musician, and engineer. In 1951, he was nominated for the Academy Award for Best Supporting Actor for his performance in The Asphalt Jungle (1950). He appeared in other classic films such as The Day the Earth Stood Still (1951) and Ben-Hur (1959). Besides, Jaffe is remembered for other outstanding performances such as the title role in Gunga Din (1939) and his role as the "High Lama" in Lost Horizon (1937).

Early life
Jaffe was born to Russian Jewish parents Heida (Ada) and Barnett Jaffe at 97 Orchard Street (current location of the Lower East Side Tenement Museum) in New York City, New York. His mother was a Yiddish actress in Odessa, Ukraine, prior to moving to the United States; his father was a jeweller. He was the youngest of four children; his siblings were Abraham, Sophie, and Annie. As a child, he appeared in Yiddish theatre productions with his mother, who after moving to the United States became a prominent actress and vaudeville star. He graduated from Townsend Harris High School and studied engineering at City College of New York, graduating in 1912. He later attended Columbia University for graduate studies. He also worked for several years as a teacher, and then dean, of mathematics at the Bronx Cultural Institute, a college preparatory school, before returning to acting in 1915.

Career

As a young man, he lived in Greenwich Village in the same apartment building as a young John Huston. The two men became good friends and remained so for life. Jaffe was later to star in two of Huston's films: The Asphalt Jungle and The Barbarian and the Geisha. Jaffe's closest friends included Zero Mostel, Edward G. Robinson, Ray Bradbury, and Igor Stravinsky. In 1923 he appeared in the Broadway premiere of God of Vengeance (Got fun Nekome) by Sholem Asch, as Reb Ali. The production became notorious after the cast, producer, and theatre owner were indicted and found guilty on charges of indecency in May 1923. Jaffe began to work in film in 1934, rising to prominence with his very first role as the mad Tsar Peter III in The Scarlet Empress. In 1938, Jaffe was forty-seven years old when he played the title role of bhisti (waterbearer) Gunga Din.

Jaffe was blacklisted by the Hollywood movie studio bosses during the 1950s, supposedly for being a communist sympathizer. Despite this, he was hired first by Robert Wise for The Day the Earth Stood Still and then by director William Wyler for his role in the 1959 Academy Award-winning version of Ben-Hur.

Jaffe co-starred in the ABC television series, Ben Casey as Dr. David Zorba from 1961 to 1965 alongside Vince Edwards. He also made many guest-starring roles on other series, including Batman as Mr. Zoltan Zorba, and the Western Alias Smith and Jones. In 1975, he co-starred as a retired doctor who is murdered by Janet Leigh in the Columbo episode "Forgotten Lady". He also appeared with an all-star cast in the TV pilot film of Rod Serling's Night Gallery and as Emperor Norton in one episode of Bonanza.

Personal life and death
Jaffe was married to American operatic soprano and musical comedy star Lillian Taiz from 1926 until her death from cancer in 1941.

In 1956, he married actress Bettye Ackerman, 33 years his junior, with whom he later co-starred in Ben Casey. She died on November 1, 2006. He had no children from either marriage.

A Democrat, Jaffe supported the campaign of Adlai Stevenson II during the 1952 presidential election.

Jaffe died of cancer in Beverly Hills, California two weeks after his 93rd birthday. He was cremated at the Pasadena Crematory in Altadena, California, and his ashes were given to his surviving wife, Bettye, and, upon her death in 2006, buried with her at Williston Cemetery in Williston, South Carolina.

Filmography

Television credits

 The Law and Mr. Jones, 1960–1961, two episodes as Martin Berger
 The Westerner, episode "The Old Man" (1961) – Old Man McKeen
 The Untouchables, episode "Augie 'The Banker' Ciamino" (1961) – Luigi Valcone
 Naked City, Economy of Death (1961) – Lazslo Lubasz
 The Islanders, "To Bell a Cat" (1961) – Papa Mathews
 Ben Casey (series, 1961–1965) – Dr. David Zorba, with Vince Edwards (127 episodes)
 Daniel Boone (1964 TV series), S2/E12 "The First Beau" (1965) – Jed Tolson
 Bonanza, episode "The Emperor Norton" (1966) – Joshua Norton
 Batman, episode "Walk The Straight and Narrow" (1966) – Zoltan Zorba (uncredited)
 Night Gallery, "The Escape Route" segment (1969)
 Alias Smith and Jones, episodes "The Great Shell Game" (1971), "A Fistful of Diamonds" (1971) and "Bad Night in Big Butte" (1972) – Soapy Saunders
 The Snoop Sisters, episode "Corpse and Robbers" (1973) – Issac Waldersack
 QB VII (1974 miniseries) : Dr. Mark Tessler
 The Streets of San Francisco, episode "Mr. Nobody" (1974) – Alex Zubatuk
 S.W.A.T., episode "Omega One" (1975) – Dr. Brunner
 Columbo: "Forgotten Lady" (1975)
 Harry O, episode "The Acolyte" (1975) – Dr. Howard Cambridge
 The Bionic Woman, episode "Kill Oscar: Part 3" (1976) – Admiral Richter
 Kojak, episode "Tears for All Who Loved Her" (1977) – Papa
 Buck Rogers in the 25th Century, episode "Flight Of The War Witch" (1980) – Council Leader
 The Love Boat, Professor Weber, (1983)

References

Further reading

External links

1891 births
1984 deaths
20th-century American male actors
Male actors from New York City
Jewish American male actors
American male film actors
American people of Russian-Jewish descent
American male stage actors
American male television actors
Deaths from cancer in California
Columbia University alumni
City College of New York alumni
Hollywood blacklist
Volpi Cup for Best Actor winners
Townsend Harris High School alumni
California Democrats
New York (state) Democrats
20th-century American Jews